Peter William Shorrocks Butterworth (4 February 1915 – 17 January 1979) was an English actor and comedian, best known for his appearances in the Carry On series of films. He was also a regular on children's television and radio, and was known for playing The Monk in Doctor Who. Butterworth was married to the actress and impressionist Janet Brown.

Biography

Early life and war service
Butterworth was born on February 4, 1915, in Bramhall, Cheshire. Before his acting career started, Butterworth served as a lieutenant in the Fleet Air Arm of the Royal Navy during the Second World War. Whilst at Stalag Luft III he met Talbot Rothwell, who later went on to write many of the Carry On films in which Butterworth was to star. Having never performed in public before his imprisonment, Butterworth formed a duo with Rothwell and sang in the camp shows. They delivered a song which Rothwell called "The Letter Edged In Black". The performance was followed by some comic repartee which, according to Butterworth's account, provoked enough boos and hisses to have the desired effect of drowning out the sounds of an escape tunnel being dug by other prisoners' escape party. After the war, Butterworth kept a photo of the concert party line-up, something which offered inspiration to him when starting a career in acting.

Butterworth was one of the vaulters covering for the escapers during the escape portrayed by the book and film The Wooden Horse. Butterworth later auditioned for the film in 1949 but "didn't look convincingly heroic or athletic enough" according to the makers of the film. Within the same camp as Butterworth and Rothwell were the future actors Rupert Davies and John Casson, the son of Lewis Casson and Sybil Thorndike. All five remained very close friends after the war ended and they all appeared on This Is Your Life when Butterworth was a subject of the programme in 1975.

Early acting career
Butterworth came to notice after appearing in pantomime around the UK. His first film appearance was in the Val Guest film William Comes to Town (1948). Guest and Butterworth became close friends and the two worked on a further seven films together during their careers. His first major success was on television in the Terry-Thomas sketch show How Do You View? in which he played the chauffeur "Lockitt": his wife, Janet Brown, was also a cast member. Butterworth also presented successful programmes aimed at children in the 1950s including Whirligig and Butterworth Time. He continued to take minor parts in films and went on to appear alongside actors including Sean Connery, David Niven and Douglas Fairbanks Jr during his career. Around the time his work in the Carry On films began, he guest appeared in two First Doctor Doctor Who stories, starring William Hartnell, in 1965/66, (The Time Meddler and The Daleks' Master Plan), playing The Monk.

He starred in the children's TV show Saturday Special (with the puppet Porterhouse the Parrot), broadcast on Saturdays at 5:00 pm, alternating with Whirligig.

Carry On films
Butterworth's association with the Carry On series began mid-way through the series with Carry On Cowboy (1965), playing the part of "Doc". He was put in touch with the creator of the series, Peter Rogers, by his friend Talbot Rothwell, the writer of Carry On Cowboy and who had written the previous four films. Out of the actors who were considered to be the Carry On team, he was the sixth most prolific performer in the series, making sixteen film appearances, two Christmas specials, the television series in 1975 and the west end theatre productions which also toured the country, alongside Sid James, Barbara Windsor and Kenneth Connor.

His Carry On appearances portrayed his characters as typically quiet and subtly eccentric. He was often cast as a stooge for another character. Thus, in Carry On Screaming! he played Detective Constable Slobotham, the assistant for Detective Sergeant Bung (Harry H. Corbett); while in Don't Lose Your Head he played Citizen Bidet, the assistant to Citizen Camembert (Kenneth Williams). In Carry On Camping he played Joshua Fiddler, the laid-back and eccentric camp site manager, who persuades Sid James character to part with most of his money when booking into the camp site. Such was his loyalty to Peter Rogers and Gerald Thomas, that Butterworth agreed to play three small roles, in Carry On Again Doctor, Carry On Loving and Carry On Henry. He was unable to take larger parts, due to other work and stage commitments, but these minor roles were specially written into the films for him.

Butterworth returned to playing more substantial parts within the Carry On films with  Carry On Abroad (1972), in which he played 'Pepe' the manager of an unfinished hotel, who greets his unexpected guests in the guise of the builder, the porter, the receptionist and telephone operator. He spends the first half of the film furiously trying to placate and accommodate them and the last half desperately trying to save the building from a flood, and whilst all this is going on, put up with his nagging wife (Hattie Jacques). Butterworth remained with the series until the final film in the main series, Carry On Emmannuelle (1978).

Later acting career
Having appeared in many of Val Guest's films during the beginning of his career, he also made three appearances in the films of Richard Lester. He appeared in Lester's film version of A Funny Thing Happened on the Way to the Forum (1966). A decade later, he appeared consecutively in The Ritz and Robin and Marian (both 1976) alongside Sean Connery, Richard Harris and Audrey Hepburn.<ref>BFI | Film & TV Database | ROBIN AND MARIAN (1976) Robin and Marion], The British Film Institute, accessed September 2011</ref> He had an uncredited cameo part in the film version of the musical Oliver! (1968) as a shopkeeper in court, and made a special appearance in an episode of Catweazle ("The Demi Devil" [1970]) and the Dad's Army episode "The Face on the Poster" (1975).

In 1975 he was the subject of an episode of This Is Your Life whereby Eamonn Andrews surprised him while he was shopping in Selfridges, London. Friends who took part in the show included Terry Scott, Talbot Rothwell, Jimmy Jewel, John Casson and Rupert Davies. Butterworth's wife and their two children, Tyler and Emma were also at the recording. When the Carry on films finished in 1978, Butterworth began to concentrate on straight roles, taking a small part in the feature film The First Great Train Robbery with Sean Connery, and the Alan Bennett play "Afternoon Off" (both 1979). These two productions were shown posthumously.

Personal life and death
Butterworth was introduced to actress and impressionist Janet Brown by Rothwell and the two married in 1946 at St Mary's, Bryanston Square, Marylebone. Brown later became known for her television impersonations of Margaret Thatcher during the 1970s and 1980s. They had two children: Their son, Tyler Butterworth, also became an actor and is married to the actress Janet Dibley. Their daughter, Emma, was born in 1962. She died in 1996 aged 34.

In 1979, whilst The First Great Train Robbery was on general release, Butterworth was starring as Widow Twankey in the pantomime Aladdin at the Coventry Theatre. When the show had finished, he went back to his hotel following the evening's performance. His failure to return for the following day's matinee show caused alarm, and he was found dead in his room from a heart attack.

Butterworth was buried in Danehill Cemetery, in East Sussex. Following his death, the producer of the Carry On films, Peter Rogers, said that Butterworth was "a thoroughly nice bloke and a dear friend".

Partial filmographyWilliam Comes to Town (1948) – PostmanMurder at the Windmill (1949) – Police ConstableMiss Pilgrim's Progress (1949) – JonathanThe Adventures of Jane (1949) – Drunken ManThe Body Said No! (1950) – DriverNight and the City (1950) – Thug (uncredited)Double Confession (1950) – Joe (uncredited)Paul Temple's Triumph (1950) – Telephone Engineer (uncredited)Mister Drake's Duck (1951) – HigginsCircle of Danger (1951) – Ernie (The Diver) (uncredited)Appointment with Venus (1951) – 1st Naval RatingThe Case of the Missing Scene (1951) – GeorgeOld Mother Riley's Jungle Treasure (1951) – SteveSaturday Island (1952) – Wounded MarinePenny Princess (1952) – Julien / Postman / FarmerWill Any Gentleman...? (1953) – Stage ManagerIs Your Honeymoon Really Necessary? (1953) – LiftmanThe Gay Dog (1954) – Another Betting ManFun at St. Fanny's (1956) – The PotterBlow Your Own Trumpet (1958) – Mr. Bob DuffTom Thumb (1958) – KapellmeisterThe Spider's Web (1960) – Insp. LordEscort for Hire (1960) – Insp. BruceMurder, She Said (1961) – Ticket CollectorFate Takes a Hand (1961) – RonnieThe Day the Earth Caught Fire (1961) – 2nd Sub-Editor (uncredited)She'll Have to Go (1962) – DoctorKill or Cure (1962) – Green Glades BarmanLive Now, Pay Later (1962) – FredThe Rescue Squad (1963) – Mr. MaggsDoctor in Distress (1963) – Ambulance DriverA Home of Your Own (1965) – The CarpenterThe Amorous Adventures of Moll Flanders (1965) – GruntNever Mention Murder (1965) – PorterCarry On Cowboy (1965) – DocCarry On Screaming! (1966) – Detective Constable SlobothamA Funny Thing Happened on the Way to the Forum (1966) – Roman Sentry #2Don't Lose Your Head (1966) – Citizen BidetOuch! (1967) – Jonah WhaleCarry On Follow That Camel (1967) – SimpsonCarry On Doctor (1967) – Mr. SmithDanny the Dragon (1967) – FarmerPrudence and the Pill (1968) – ChemistCarry On Up the Khyber (1968) – Brother BelcherCarry On Camping (1969) – Josh FiddlerCarry On Again Doctor (1969) – Shuffling PatientCarry On Loving (1970) – Sinister Client (uncredited)Carry On Henry (1971) – Charles, Earl of Bristol (uncredited)The Magnificent Seven Deadly Sins (1971) – Guest Appearance (segment "Sloth")A Class by Himself (1972) – CluttonBless This House (1972) – Trevor LewisCarry On Abroad (1972) – PepeNot Now Darling (1973) – Painter (uncredited)Carry On Girls (1973) – AdmiralCarry On Dick (1974) – TomCarry On Behind (1975) – Henry BarnesRobin and Marian (1976) – SurgeonThe Ritz (1976) – Patron In ChapsCarry On England (1976) – Major CarstairsOdd Man Out (1977) – WilfWhat's Up Nurse! (1978) – Police SergeantCarry On Emmannuelle (1978) – RichmondThe First Great Train Robbery'' (1979) – Putnam

References

Sources

External links
 Details of Butterworth's wartime service

External links

 

1915 births
1979 deaths
English male comedians
English male film actors
English male stage actors
English male television actors
People from Bramhall
World War II prisoners of war held by Germany
British World War II prisoners of war
Fleet Air Arm aviators
Royal Navy officers of World War II
People educated at William Hulme's Grammar School
20th-century English male actors
British male comedy actors
20th-century English comedians
Shot-down aviators
Fleet Air Arm personnel of World War II
People from Danehill, East Sussex